Allen Lake is a lake in Clearwater County, Minnesota, in the United States.

Allen Lake was named for James Allen, a travel companion of Henry Schoolcraft on one of the latter's expeditions.

See also
List of lakes in Minnesota

References

Lakes of Minnesota
Lakes of Clearwater County, Minnesota